"The Road" is the opening track of Live: The Road, a 1988 live album by The Kinks. It was written by The Kinks' primary songwriter, Ray Davies.

Lyrics

Described as "a chronicle of the band's typical touring experiences" by AllMusic'''s Stephen Thomas Erlewine, "The Road" mentions the singer's experiences in with "bed and breakfasts and the greasy spoons ... loser bars and the noisy rooms ... [and] the casualties who did too many lines." This topic of touring has been addressed by Ray Davies multiple times prior to the writing of this song, from "This Time Tomorrow" from Lola Versus Powerman and the Moneygoround, Part One to "Life on the Road" from the album Sleepwalker.

Release and reception

"The Road" was released on the 1988 album, Live: The Road, where it was the song recorded in the studio (and one of the two songs on the album never before released). However, prior to the release of Live: The Road, "The Road" saw single release in Britain (but not America.) Backed with a version of "Art Lover" from Live: The Road, the single failed to chart, being the first of three consecutive singles not to chart in the United Kingdom. It has since appeared on the compilation albums Lost & Found (1986-1989) and Picture Book.

Despite citing the song as a highlight from both Live: The Road and Lost & Found (1986-1989), Stephen Thomas Erlewine said that "like the rest of [Live: The Road''], the song wasn't anything special."

References

The Kinks songs
1988 singles
Songs written by Ray Davies
Song recordings produced by Ray Davies
1987 songs
MCA Records singles